Pärnu County ( or Pärnumaa) is one of 15 counties of Estonia. It is situated in the south-western part of the country, on the coast of Gulf of Riga, and borders Lääne and Rapla counties to the north, Järva and Viljandi counties to the east, and Latvia to the south. In 2022 Pärnu County had a population of 85,705 – constituting 6.4% of the total population of Estonia.

Pärnu County is the largest county of Estonia in terms of land area.

History 

In Pärnu county there is the oldest known human settlement in Estonia, which is the town of Sindi, and it is  up the Pärnu River, near the village of Pulli. It dates back to 8500 BCE in the Mesolithic historical period.

County Government
The County Government (Estonian: Maavalitsus) is led by a governor (Estonian: maavanem), who is appointed by the Government of Estonia for a term of five years. Since 1 January 2010, the Governor position is held by Andres Metsoja.

Tourism 
The city of Pärnu is a popular holiday resort for Estonians and increasingly for non-Estonians, e.g., from Sweden, Finland, Germany, and Russia.

Municipalities 
The county is subdivided into municipalities. There is one urban municipality (Estonian: linnad – towns) and six rural municipalities (Estonian: vallad – parishes) in Pärnu County.

Religion

Geography

Gallery

References

External links 

Pärnu County Official website
Pärnu County Government (in Estonian)
Town of Pärnu Official website

 
Counties of Estonia